Garsevareh (also Romanized as Garsevāreh) is a village in Charam Rural District, in the Central District of Charam County, Kohgiluyeh and Boyer-Ahmad Province, Iran. At the 2006 census, its population was 44, in 8 families.

References 

Populated places in Charam County